Rosa Méndez Leza (31 August 1935 – 29 December 2018), known professionally as Rosenda Monteros, was a Mexican actress. She studied drama under Seki Sano. To American audiences, she is best known for her role as Petra in The Magnificent Seven. She had a prolific film career north and south of the U.S.–Mexican border.

From 1955 to 1957, she was married to director Julio Bracho.

Partial filmography

Reto a la vida (1954) — María (uncredited)
Take Me in Your Arms (1954) — Martha
The White Orchid (1954) — Lupita
María la Voz (1955) — Isabel
A Woman's Devotion (1956) — María
Feliz año, amor mío (1957) — Luisa
El diario de mi madre (1958) — Enedina
Las tres pelonas (1958) — María
Villa!! (1958) — Marianna Villa
La gran caída (1958)
Nazarín (1959) — La Prieta
Sábado negro (1959)
La ciudad sagrada (1959)
El Esqueleto de la señora Morales (1960) — Meche, the servant
The Magnificent Seven (1960) — Petra
Los cuervos (1961) — Laura
Tiara Tahiti (1962) — Belle Annie
The Mighty Jungle (1964) — Orica
Valería (1965, TV Series)
She (1965) — Ustane
Ninette y un señor de Murcia (1965) — Ninette
Savage Pampas (1966) — Rucu
Eve (1968) — Pili Conchita
¡Dame un poco de amooor...! (1968) — Chin Sao Ling
Un Extraño en la Casa (1968) — Diana
Coleccionista de cadáveres, El (1970) — Valerie
Los perros de Dios (1974)
Rapiña (1975)
Las siete cucas (1981) — Benita's Servant
La casa de Bernarda Alba (1982) — Martirio
Sexo impostor (2005)

References

External links

 Monteros reads "Romanticismos," by Francisco González Léon

1935 births
2018 deaths
Mexican film actresses
People from Veracruz (city)
Mexican telenovela actresses
Actresses from Veracruz